The 1370s in music involved some significant events.

Events 
1371 – Ludi theatrales (the earliest mention of vernacular biblical plays in Eastern Europe) were banned from the Corpus Christi processions in Bohemia.

Compositions 
 1378 – Matheus de Sancto Johanne, Inclite flos orti Gebenensis, (ballade) for three voices, dedicated to Pope Clement VII, who bestowed a canonicate in Laon upon the composer in this year.

Bands formed 
1372 – Cappela della Signoria, in the Republic of Lucca.

Births 
 Possible decade – Leonel Power, English composer (d. 1445)

Deaths 
 1372 (December) or 1373 (January) – Lorenzo da Firenze, Italian composer
 1377 – April: Guillaume de Machaut, French composer and poet (b. c.1300)

References 

14th century in music